The Livingstone Tower is a prominent high rise building in Glasgow, Scotland and is a part of the University of Strathclyde's John Anderson Campus. The building was named after David Livingstone. The address of the building is 26 Richmond Street, Glasgow.

The building is a notable landmark in the eastern side of the city centre, and its high position on the drumlin of Rottenrow means it can be seen from some considerable distance throughout the city's East End.  It was also among the earliest high-rise commercial buildings to go up in the city centre in the post-war period, pre-dated only by St Andrew's House (1964), Fleming House (1961), and the Royal Stuart Hotel (1963)—the latter having been owned by Strathclyde University in the 1980s and early 1990s as a student hall of residence.

Construction and history

Early years
The Livingstone Tower was constructed between 1962 and 1964 as Alec House – a commercial office building in a partnership between  Glasgow Corporation, the former Royal College of Science and Technology and a commercial development company.  The site was formerly occupied by a row of tenement houses, but these were cleared after Townhead was declared a Comprehensive Development Area (CDA) in the 1950s.  As part of this development – inspired by the findings of the 1945 Bruce Report, central areas of the city were re-zoned for commercial or educational use.

The building is of reinforced concrete construction, and was state of the art in its construction methods at the time – being clad with a curtain wall in opaque dark green glass spandrel panels framed by orange metal uprights.  With its original commercial use in mind it featured an advanced elevator system for its day – four Otis Autotronic gearless lifts (also used in St. Andrew House on Sauchiehall Street) which were capable of responding to the traffic flow within the building at specific times of the day.  The tower is served by two staircases within the main service core whilst a third staircase that serves only the first two floors was later added due to these levels being devoted entirely to lecture rooms. The building is electrically heated and was also intended to feature a restaurant on the ground floor which the University later turned into a student refectory.

The tower sits atop a 3-storey concrete podium shared with the neighbouring McCance Building, an NCP car park, and a row of retail units at street level on George Street.  There is also private car parking for Glasgow City Council.  There was also a raised empty concrete podium between the tower and the McCance Building upon which the University would later add the Collins Building in 1973.

In 1965, one year after the creation of the University of Strathclyde, the building had still not attracted any private tenants. The adjacent McCance Building which was being built at the same time to house the University's library, arts and social studies departments. The two buildings ultimately became part of a plan to expand the University by adding more buildings and learning space, and so it was decided the building would be leased to the University.  This lease was set to last 100 years and is due to end in 2064. Upon signing the lease, the  University quickly dropped the original Alec House name and initially renamed it the "David Livingstone Tower" after David Livingstone - in recognition of his study at the medical school of Anderson's College (the original institution from which Strathclyde University evolved), but the name was soon shortened to simply "Livingstone Tower".  At the time the building was used to expand the departments that were to be included in the McCance building. Since then it has grown and is now home to five of the university's departments.

Recent history
In 2000 the Hunter Centre for Entrepreneurship  was built by converting the former roof terrace into offices, thus creating a fourteenth floor, accessed by stairs from the thirteenth floor. It was all part of the Strathclyde Entrepreneurship Initiative. The Hunter Centre provides elective classes related to different areas of business. It was named after Sir Tom Hunter after his £5 million endowment to the university to help fund the new centre.  In 2011 they relocated to the 199 Cathedral Street building, being replaced with the Strathclyde Business School Centre for Corporate Connections department.

The building received a refurbishment in 2010, which saw internal realignment of some rooms and facilities, replacement of the outer spandrel panels, a new modern languages centre built and the floors redesignated by transposing the ground floor to level 1, thus the former roof terrace becoming Level 15 - The studios of the radio station Celtic Music Radio used to be on the 14th Floor of the building within the Hunter Centre.

Under the University's £300m masterplan for campus consolidation and renewal, it has proposed to vacate the entire Livingstone Tower/McCance/Collins Building complex and relocate the Humanities and Social Sciences departments to the Lord Hope Building in Cathedral Street.  A revised plan was released in 2011 which showed that the tower would remain in use until the year 2023, after which the building would be returned to Glasgow City Council for future redevelopment.

Location 

The building is located within the John Anderson Campus of the University of Strathclyde.  It is part of a mixed-use development which includes the University's own McCance and Collins Buildings, a two-storey sub-surface NCP car park, and a row of retail units at street level on George Street.  There is also private car parking for Glasgow City Council.

The tower itself (arguably designed in the International Style) follows a contrasting architectural paradigm to the rest of the attaching buildings, which are of a distinctly Brutalist style – fashionable in the 1960s.

In popular culture 

Games developer Chris Sawyer, an alumnus of the University of Strathclyde, based one of the skyscraper sprites appearing in the computer game Transport Tycoon on Livingstone Tower.
Livinsgtone Tower is affectionately known by students as 'Livvy Tower' or 'Livi tower' and is one of the most popular buildings on campus.

Departments 
The Livingstone Tower is the home to many departments including:
Computer and Information Sciences
Mathematics and Statistics
English Language Teaching Division
Strathclyde Business School Centre for Corporate Connections

References

External links 

University of Strathclyde
Skyscrapers in Glasgow
University and college buildings completed in 1965
Skyscraper office buildings in Scotland
1965 establishments in Scotland